Line C is a line designation used in several public transport systems

 RER C, a commuter rail line in Paris, France
 Line C (Prague Metro), a metro line in Prague, Czech Republic
 Line C (Buenos Aires Underground), a metro line in Buenos Aires, Argentina
 Bordeaux Tramway line C, a tram route in Bordeaux, France
 Lyon Metro Line C, a metro line in Lyon, France
 C Line (RTD), a light rail line in Denver, Colorado, United States
 Line C (Rome Metro), a metro line in Rome, Italy
 C Line (Los Angeles Metro), a light rail line in Los Angeles County, California
 C (Los Angeles Railway), former streetcar service In Los Angeles, US
 Avenue C Line (Manhattan), a bus route in New York City, United States
 C (New York City Subway service), a subway route in New York City, United States
 C (S-train), a commuter rail line in Copenhagen, Denmark
 RapidRide C Line, a bus route in Seattle, United States
 C Line (Minnesota), a rapid bus route in Minneapolis, United States

See also
 C Train (disambiguation)